In enzymology, a xyloglucan 4-glucosyltransferase is an enzyme that catalyzes the chemical reaction in which a beta-D-glucosyl residue is transferred from UDP-glucose to another glucose residue in xyloglucan, linked by a beta-1,4-D-glucosyl-D-glucose bond.

This enzyme belongs to the family of glycosyltransferases, specifically the hexosyltransferases.  The systematic name of this enzyme class is UDP-glucose:xyloglucan 1,4-beta-D-glucosyltransferase. Other names in common use include uridine diphosphoglucose-xyloglucan 4beta-glucosyltransferase, xyloglucan 4beta-D-glucosyltransferase, and xyloglucan glucosyltransferase.

References

 
 

EC 2.4.1
Enzymes of unknown structure